Carry the Meek is the debut album by Irish band Ham Sandwich. It was released on 18 February 2008 and has received average to favourable reviews.

Production
Ham Sandwich had been performing live for several years and had already released several singles before beginning work on their first album in 2006. Carry the Meek was recorded starting at JAM Studios, Kells with Producer Martin Quinn and also in a home-made studio at Headfort House in their home-town of Kells, produced by Karl Odlum and mastered by Fred Kevorkian. The album was released on 15 February 2008 on the band's own label, Route 109A Records. On the day that the album was released the band won the Hope for 2008 Award at the Meteor Music Awards.

The artwork for the album was designed with the help of the band's fans, who were encouraged to send the band their photographs on the theme of heartbreak.

Reception

Upon its release the album peaked at 23 on the Irish album charts.  Reviews from the Irish media were generally positive.

Patrick Freyne of Hot Press gave the album 4 out of 5 stars, saying "Generally the tracks have a real heart tugging quality to them, with rising melodies and great musical diversions as middle eighths – the band really know how to build a song to an epic climax", singling out the vocal interplay between McNamee and Farrell as the band's "secret weapon".  Harry Guerin writing for RTÉ Entertainment gave an equally positive review, declaring that "Ham Sandwich turn in as assured and alluring a debut as you'll get".

A less positive review by Lauren Murphy of entertainment.ie gave the album 2 out of 5 stars, saying that "Carry the Meek is a disappointing, characterless album that offers little or no sense of individuality. Like a ham sandwich, it fills a void and will do for the time being - but sometimes, you need to sink your teeth into something a bit more nutritious".

Track listing

Sources:

Personnel 
Ham Sandwich
Niamh Farrell - lead vocals
Podge McNamee - lead vocals, guitar
Brian Darcy - guitar
John Moore - bass
Ollie Murphy - drums

Production
Karl Odlum - production
Martin Quinn - engineering

Charts

References

2008 debut albums
Ham Sandwich (band) albums